Walter Stephan Baring Jr. (September 9, 1911 – July 13, 1975) was a United States representative from Nevada.

Biography
Baring was born in Goldfield, Nevada, to Emily L. and Walter Stephan Baring, his paternal grandparents were born in Germany and his maternal grandfather was from Bohemia. His father served on the Esmeralda County Commission for a while, until he moved the family to Reno. His father then managed a furniture store. Baring graduated from the University of Nevada in 1934 with two bachelor's degrees. After graduating, he worked as a collector for the U.S. Internal Revenue Service.

Naval Service
Baring served as a Member of the Nevada Assembly in 1936. He was subsequently reelected, but resigned in 1943 so that he could serve in the United States Navy during World War II. After the war, he was elected to the Reno City Council.

During the Presidency of Franklin Roosevelt, Baring strongly criticized the President's court-packing plan for the United States Supreme Court.

U.S. Representative
Baring was first elected to Nevada's sole seat in the House of Representatives in 1948, unseating first-term Republican incumbent Charles H. Russell by 761 votes.  He was reelected in 1950, but in 1952, he was unexpectedly defeated by Republican Cliff Young, who won that election by 771 votes. Baring ran against Young again in 1954, but Young again managed a narrow victory. In 1956, Young ran for the U.S. Senate against incumbent Democrat Alan Bible, who narrowly defeated him in the general election. That year, Baring ran for Congress again, defeating Las Vegas City Attorney Howard Cannon in the Democratic primary before winning the general. Baring was reelected in a landslide in 1958, while Cannon was elected to the U.S. Senate.

During his first two terms in Congress, Baring compiled a liberal voting record.  After his return, however, he veered considerably to the right, billing himself as a "Jeffersonian States' Rights Democrat." He usually voted with the conservative Southern wing of his party. He was critical of John F. Kennedy and voted against most of Lyndon Johnson's Great Society programs. This angered many in his own party, and Baring often claimed, "No one likes Walter Baring but the voters." He was known to equate liberalism with socialism and Communism, and opposed foreign aid of any sort. During the 1960s, Baring faced more strenuous opposition in the Democratic primaries than in the general elections, owing to his ability to attract large numbers of registered Republicans, especially in the northwest of the state. In these contests, Baring was able to run up enough of a margin in the "Cow Counties" (the more rural parts of Nevada) to overcome large deficits in Clark and Washoe counties (home to Las Vegas and Reno, respectively).

Segregation activist
Baring contended that the Civil Rights Movement was influenced by Communists. He was nearly defeated for renomination in 1964 after leading the opposition to the Civil Rights Act of 1964.

In 1972, Baring was narrowly defeated in the Democratic primary by a considerably more liberal Democrat, Las Vegas attorney and future Congressman James Bilbray. By this time Clark and Washoe counties were well into a period of explosive growth that continues today, and Bilbray's margin in those counties was too much for Baring to overcome. Claiming that Bilbray had smeared him, Baring endorsed the Republican nominee, David Towell, helping him win the general election in an upset.

Last years
After leaving Congress, Baring remained interested in politics, even flirting with a run for governor in 1974. However, a bout of emphysema and heart strain ended that prospect. He died of heart and lung failure in 1975 at the age of 63.

Education
High school teacher's certificate
University of Nevada at Reno, B.A. and B.S., 1934
Reno High School, 1929

References

External links

Biographical Directory, of the United States Congress

Nevada Riches, Other political figures
, The Paradoxical Politician

1911 births
1975 deaths
20th-century American politicians
United States Navy personnel of World War II
American people of Bohemian descent
American people of German descent
Democratic Party members of the United States House of Representatives from Nevada
Democratic Party members of the Nevada Assembly
Military personnel from Nevada
Nevada city council members
People from Goldfield, Nevada
Politicians from Reno, Nevada
Reno High School alumni
University of Nevada, Reno alumni